The Squaw Bay Limestone is a geologic formation in Michigan. It preserves fossils dating back to the Devonian period. The ammonoid Koenenites has been found in this formation.

References
 

Devonian Michigan
Upper Devonian Series
Middle Devonian Series